Richard Nute is an electrical engineer from The Consultant in Bend, Oregon. He was named a Fellow of the Institute of Electrical and Electronics Engineers (IEEE) in 2016 for his contributions to safety engineering of electrical and electronic products.

References

Fellow Members of the IEEE
Living people
Year of birth missing (living people)
Place of birth missing (living people)
American electrical engineers